Mister Know-It-All (or Mr. Know-It-All) is an American animated web series distributed by technology news magazine Wired, based on the popular advice column.

Background 
After Wired joined Condé Nast's Digital Video Network, five original web series were announced for Wired'''s video channel including Mister Know-It-All and Codefellas.

 Production 
Animation for Mister Know-It-All'' is produced by M. Wartella's studio, Dream Factory Animation, for Condé Nast and @radical.media in the style of illustrator Christoph Niemann.  Music and sound design were created by Sam Retzer.

The first trailer was uploaded on June 4, 2013.  The first episode, "Toddler Music", was uploaded on June 14, 2013, and the second episode, "Expired Medication", was uploaded on July 26, 2013.

See also 
List of Web television series

References

External links 
Official site

Episodes 

2013 American television series debuts
2013 web series debuts
American comedy web series
Wired (magazine)
YouTube original programming